Gilles Francis Charles Bensimon (born 29 February 1944) is a French fashion photographer and the former International Creative Director of Elle magazine. He has also been the photographer for the reality television series America's Next Top Model.

Early life
Bensimon was born in Vic-sur-Cère in Cantal, France. He had advanced dyslexia, hence his mother's suggestion - that if he did something in art, he could express himself better. Living in Paris, France, he joined the French Elle magazine in 1967. Two years later, Bensimon helped launch American Elle, for which he later photographed Christy Turlington, Cindy Crawford, Bridget Hall, Naomi Campbell, Tyra Banks, Rachel Williams, Honor Fraser, Yasmin Le Bon, Elle Macpherson, and Beverly Peele.

Career
Under his leadership, Elle magazine reached a huge audience of 20 million readers globally, as he served as both International Creative Director and Head Photographer. He is known as a celebrity photographer, with a portfolio consisting of leading models and celebrities, including Claudia Schiffer, Naomi Campbell,  Christy Turlington, Linda Evangelista, Nadège du Bospertus, Gisele Bündchen, Bridget Hall, Madonna, Gwyneth Paltrow, Sharon Stone, Keira Knightley, Beyoncé, Jennifer Lopez, Reese Witherspoon, Sarah Jessica Parker, Halle Berry, and Uma Thurman. He's worked with cosmetic brands like Kohl's, Saks Fifth Avenue, Maybelline and Clarins.

Personal life
Gilles Bensimon had a child with his first wife, Pacha. The marriage ended in divorce before a short-lived marriage to the Australian model Elle Macpherson. He wed a third time in 1997 to Kelly Killoren. They had two children and the marriage ended in divorce 10 years later in 2007.

References

External links

Walter Schupfer Management

1944 births
Living people
American photographers
French photographers
Fashion photographers
Artists from Paris